Aung La Maung Nsang 
(born on May 21, 1985) is a Burmese-American mixed martial artist of ethnic Kachin descent currently signed to ONE Championship, competing in both the Middleweight and Light heavyweight divisions. He is a former ONE Middleweight World Champion and ONE Light Heavyweight World Champion. 

He made his MMA debut in 2005 and would go on to become a major star in his native Myanmar after signing with ONE Championship and winning two titles with the organization.

He is also one of the few Myanmar citizens with an international profile, given the country only began opening up to the outside world over the last decade. Aung La was the subject of unprecedented national attention in the lead-up to the fight with Russia's then-middleweight champion Vitaly Bigdash, with billboards across Yangon featuring massive portraits of the two fighters.

Being a national icon of Myanmar, his own bronze statue erected in 2018 at the Kachin National Manau Park in his hometown of Myitkyina. During the opening ceremony of the statue a huge crowd of thousands fans gathered.

Early life and education
Aung La was born in Myitkyina, Kachin State, Myanmar to Christian Kachin parents Nsang Tu Awng, a jewellery trader, and his wife Shadan Nang Bu. He is the third son of five siblings. He attended high school at International School Yangon. In 2003, he moved to the United States to study Agriculture Science at Andrews University in Berrien Springs, Michigan. He graduated in 2007 and worked as a migratory beekeeper while keeping up his MMA training.

Aung La Nsang said he got his nickname of the "Burmese Python" while fighting in the Midwest.  A promoter from the Midwest asked where he was from and didn't know where Burma was.  Aung La Nsang told him Burma was where the Burmese Python is from and so the promoter started to call him that.  The geo-political sensitivities was not aware to the promoter.

Aung La Nsang said, "Of course the Kachin people want me to become the Kachin Python or the Kachin Lion, but you can't give yourself a nickname ... It just comes from the fans."

Lethwei

Aung La Nsang has no formal training in his home country's traditional art of Lethwei and only fought with his cousins and friends. He said his uncle used to fight in Lethwei, but his experience was limited. He lists Tway Ma Shaung as one of his favorite Lethwei fighters alongside Lone Chaw. Aung La has often expressed his interest in Lethwei. and stated being open to a mixed-rules MMA-Lethwei fight, which could happen as ONE Championship already held Lethwei fights, notably at ONE Championship: Light of a Nation.

Mixed martial arts career

Early career
Aung La made his professional debut in 2005, and soon built a reputation for his outstanding submission skills, earning himself the nickname of The Burmese Python. Early in his career, Aung La fought for King of the Cage and Ring of Combat as well as other, smaller promotions. However, his career got off to a slow start, with Aung La losing his first fight. At the age of 27, he became a social media sensation when footage of him knocking out Jason Louck at CFFC 17 went viral in the Kachin State. After the fight, he posed with a Kachin flag.

ONE Championship
He made his ONE Championship debut in June 2014 and has headlined multiple shows at the Thuwunna Stadium in Yangon since 2016. After signing with ONE in 2014, Aung La Nsang returned to his home country of Myanmar two years later at ONE Championship: Union of Warriors, winning his bout to become a national hero.

On March 18, 2016, he fought in Yangon for the first time, beating Mohamed Ali by submission.

2017: ONE Middleweight Champion
On January 14, 2017, Aung La Nsang challenged Vitaly Bigdash for the ONE Middleweight World Championship at ONE Championship: Quest for Power. He lost the fight via unanimous decision.

On June 30, 2017, he became Myanmar's first ever world champion in any mainstream sport, beating Vitaly Bigdash at ONE Championship: Light of a Nation to win the ONE Middleweight World Championship. 

On November 3, 2017, Aung La Nsang faced Alain Ngalani at ONE Championship: Hero's Dream in the first openweight bout in ONE Championship history, winning by submission. 

Later that year he met with State Counsellor of Myanmar Aung San Suu Kyi to discuss  the issues in the Kachin State.

2018: Title defenses & ONE Light Heavyweight Champion
On February 23, 2018, he stopped Alexandre Machado at ONE Championship: Quest for Gold in Yangon to win the ONE Light Heavyweight World Championship to become only the second fighter, after Martin Nguyen, to win ONE Championship titles in two divisions.

On June 29, 2018, Aung La Nsang defended the ONE Middleweight title for the first time against Ken Hasegawa at ONE Championship: Spirit of a Warrior in Yangon in what is now considered one of the greatest title fights in ONE Championship history. He defeated Hasegawa by TKO in the fifth round to retain the title.  

On October 26, 2018, he beat Mohammad Karaki by TKO via punches at ONE Championship: Pursuit of Greatness in Yangon to retain the ONE Middleweight title.

2019: Title defenses
On March 31, 2019, he defended his title against Ken Hasegawa for a second time at ONE Championship: A New Era in Tokyo, retaining his ONE Middleweight title via technical knockout.

After his title defense against Hasegawa, Aung La signed a new ten-fight contract with ONE Championship.

Aung La made his first defense of the ONE Light Heavyweight World Championship against Brandon Vera at ONE Championship: Century on October 13, 2019. During the match, Aung La connected on a spinning back elbow that sent Vera stumbling and followed it through with punches. Aung La defeated Vera by technical knockout in the second round and successfully defended the ONE Light Heavyweight title.

2020: Losing the Middleweight Championship
Aung La Nsang was next expected to defend his ONE Middleweight World Championship against Reinier de Ridder, event and date to be determined. However, de Ridder was later pulled from the bout. Aung La will now face former middleweight champion Vitaly Bigdash for a third time at ONE Infinity 1 on April 10, 2020. However, their title fight was canceled due to the impact of the COVID-19 pandemic on sports.

On September 9, 2020, it was revealed that Aung La would be defending his ONE Middleweight World Championship against Reinier de Ridder once again at ONE Championship: Inside the Matrix on October 30, 2020. On October 30, 2020, Aung La lost to de Ridder by submission in the first round, ending his reign as ONE Middleweight World Champion.

2021: Losing the Light Heavyweight Championship
Aung La was expected to defend the ONE Light Heavyweight Championship against Vitaly Bigdash in a trilogy bout at ONE on TNT 4 on April 28, 2021. After Vitaly Bigdash tested positive for COVID-19, Reinier de Ridder took his place. He lost the fight and the belt by unanimous decision.

Aung La faced former ONE Middleweight title contender Leandro Ataides at ONE Championship: Battleground on July 30, 2021. He won the bout via knockout in the first round.

2022: Post-championship run 
Aung La faced fellow ONE World Champion and former ONE Middleweight Champion Vitaly Bigdash in a trilogy fight at ONE: Full Circle on February 25, 2022. He lost by unanimous decision.

Aung La was scheduled to face Yushin Okami at ONE on Prime Video 4 on November 19, 2022. However, the bout was postponed to ONE 163 for undisclosed reasons. He won the fight via technical knockout in the first round and during the post-fight interview he pay tribute to his teammate Anthony "Rumble" Johnson who passed away this week.

Aung La was scheduled to face Fan Rong on February 14, 2023, at ONE on Prime Video 6. However, Rong withdrawn from the bout after having tested positive for COVID-19 and was replaced by Gilberto Galvão at a catchweight of 215 pounds. He won the fight via technical knockout in the first round. This win earned him the Performance of the Night award.

The match between Aung La and Rong was rescheduled for May 5, 2023, at ONE Fight Night 10.

Honored by Tatmadaw
In July 2018, Commander-in-Chief Snr-Gen Min Aung Hlaing issued an official statement of congratulations, claiming the ethnic Kachin fighter embodies the indomitable spirit of Myanmar, the pride of the nation. Aung La was invited to the Ministry of Defence and presented with a cash award as a token of appreciation and recognition by representatives of all three branches of the Myanmar armed forces.

On February 24, 2018, Commander-in-Chief Snr-Gen Min Aung Hlaing and Tatmadaw (army, navy, air force) officials honored to Aung La Nsang. On behalf of the Tatmadaw Commander-in-Chief, Yangon Command Commander Maj-Gen Thet Pone presented Aung La Nsang with a Myanmar Ks 10 million cash prize, as well as a certificate of honor sent by the Tatmadaw Commander-in-Chief, at an event held at the Rose Garden Hotel in Yangon.

Charity work
Since becoming a superstar in his native land via his ONE Championship success, Aung La has committed himself to several charity projects, using his reach and fame to try and help the people of Myanmar. In particular, he has given his backing to educational charities such as "Street School Initiative"  and Global Citizen, as well as other causes in his native Kachin state.

Aung La is a passionate advocate for Myanmar's wildlife and he has been a big supporter of Voices for momos, a campaign against illegal wildlife trade, since its launch in November 2017.

On 9 November 2018, Aung La was appointed as ambassador of Fighting Wildlife Crime by World Wide Fund for Nature, Myanmar.

Championships and accomplishments
ONE Championship
ONE Middleweight Championship (One time)
Three successful title defenses
ONE Light Heavyweight Championship (One time)
One successful title defense
Performance of the Night (One time) 
World MMA Awards
2018 International Fighter of the Year

Mixed martial arts record

|-
|Win
|align=center|29–13 (1) 
|Gilberto Galvão
|TKO (punches)
|ONE Fight Night 6
|
|align=center|1 
|align=center|1:29 
|Bangkok, Thailand
|
|-
|Win
|align=center|28–13 (1)
|Yushin Okami
|TKO (punches)
|ONE 163
|
|align=center|1
|align=center|1:42
|Kallang, Singapore
|
|-
| Loss
|align=center|27–13 (1) 
| Vitaly Bigdash 
| Decision (unanimous) 
|ONE: Full Circle
|
|align=center|3
|align=center|5:00 
|Kallang, Singapore
| 
|-
| Win
| align=center|27–12 (1)
| Leandro Ataides
| KO (punches)
| ONE 139: Battleground
| 
| align=center|1
| align=center|3:45
| Kallang, Singapore
|  
|-
|Loss
|align=center|26–12 (1)
|Reinier de Ridder 
|Decision (unanimous)
|ONE 135: ONE on TNT 4
|
|align=center|5
|align=center|5:00
|Kallang, Singapore
|
|-
| Loss
| align=center|26–11 (1)
| Reinier de Ridder 
| Submission (rear-naked choke)
| ONE 118: Inside the Matrix
| 
| align=center|1
| align=center|3:26
| Kallang, Singapore
| 
|-
| Win
| align=center|26–10 (1)
| Brandon Vera
| TKO (punches)
| ONE Championship 100: Century Part 2
| 
| align=center|2
| align=center|3:23
| Tokyo, Japan
| 
|-
| Win
| align=center | 25–10 (1)
| Ken Hasegawa
| TKO (punches)
| ONE 90: A New Era
| 
| align=center | 2
| align=center | 4:41
| Tokyo, Japan
| 
|-
| Win
| align=center | 24–10 (1)
| Mohammad Karaki
| TKO (punches)
| ONE 80: Pursuit of Greatness
| 
| align=center | 1
| align=center | 2:21
| Yangon, Myanmar
| 
|-
| Win
| align=center | 23–10 (1)
| Ken Hasegawa
| KO (punch)
| ONE 73: Spirit of a Warrior
| 
| align=center | 5
| align=center | 3:13
| Yangon, Myanmar
| 
|-
| Win
| align=center | 22–10 (1)
| Alexandre Machado
| TKO (head kick and punches)
| ONE 66: Quest for Gold
| 
| align=center | 1
| align=center | 0:56
| Yangon, Myanmar
| 
|-
| Win
| align=center | 21–10 (1)
| Alain Ngalani
| Submission (guillotine choke)
| ONE 60: Hero's Dream
| 
| align=center | 1
| align=center | 4:31
| Yangon, Myanmar
| 
|-
| Win
| align=center | 20–10 (1)
| Vitaly Bigdash 
| Decision (unanimous)
| ONE 55: Light of a Nation
| 
| align=center | 5
| align=center | 5:00
| Yangon, Myanmar
| 
|-
| Loss
| align=center | 19–10 (1)
| Vitaly Bigdash 
| Decision (unanimous)
| ONE 50: Quest for Power
| 
| align=center | 5
| align=center | 5:00
| Jakarta, Indonesia
| 
|-
| Win
| align=center | 19–9 (1)
| Michal Pasternak
| Decision (unanimous)
| ONE 47: State of Warriors
| 
| align=center | 3
| align=center | 5:00
| Yangon, Myanmar
| 
|-
| Win
| align=center | 18–9 (1)
| Aleksei Butorin
| Submission (arm-triangle choke) 
| ONE 43: Dynasty of Champions 6
| 
| align=center | 2
| align=center | 1:57
| Hefei, China
| 
|-
| Win
| align=center | 17–9 (1)
| Mohamed Ali
| Submission (guillotine choke)
| ONE 39: Union of Warriors
| 
| align=center | 1
| align=center | 2:38
| Yangon, Myanmar
| 
|-
| Win
| align=center | 16–9 (1)
| Mahmoud Salama
| KO (punches)
| ONE FC 17: Era of Champions
| 
| align=center | 1
| align=center | 1:07
| Jakarta, Indonesia
| 
|-
| Loss
| align=center| 15–9 (1)
| Jonavin Webb
| TKO (knee)
| CFFC 28: Brenneman vs. Baker
| 
| align=center|1
| align=center|2:41
| Atlantic City, New Jersey, United States
|
|-
| Win
| align=center| 15–8 (1)
| Shedrick Goodridge
| Submission (guillotine choke)
| CFFC 26: Sullivan vs. Martinez
| 
| align=center|2
| align=center|1:44
| Atlantic City, New Jersey, United States
|
|-
| NC
| align=center| 14–8 (1)
| Kyle Baker
| No Contest
| CFFC 23: La Nsang vs. Baker
| 
| align=center|1
| align=center|0:24
| King of Prussia, Pennsylvania, United States
|
|-
| Win
| align=center| 14–8
| Jason Louck
| KO (punch)
| CFFC 17: Nsang vs. Louck
| 
| align=center|1
| align=center|2:30
| Dover, Delaware, United States
|
|-
| Win
| align=center| 13–8
| Jesus Martinez
| TKO (punches)
| Bellator 68
| 
| align=center|1
| align=center|0:36
| Atlantic City, New Jersey, United States
|
|-
| Loss
| align=center| 12–8
| Sam Oropeza
| Submission (guillotine choke)
| Matrix Fights 5
| 
| align=center|2
| align=center|0:56
| Philadelphia, Pennsylvania, United States
|
|-
| Loss
| align=center| 12–7
| Drew Puzon
| Decision (unanimous)
| ROC 38: Ring of Combat 38
| 
| align=center|3
| align=center|4:00
| Atlantic City, New Jersey, United States
|
|-
| Win
| align=center| 12–6
| Casey Manrique
| TKO (punches)
| ROC 37: Ring of Combat 37
| 
| align=center|2
| align=center|1:03
| Atlantic City, New Jersey, United States
|
|-
| Loss
| align=center| 11–6
| Uriah Hall
| KO (punch)
| ROC 35: Ring of Combat 35
| 
| align=center|3
| align=center|1:37
| Atlantic City, New Jersey, United States
|
|-
| Win
| align=center| 11–5
| Mitch Whitesel
| Submission (guillotine choke)
| ROC 34: Ring of Combat 34
| 
| align=center|1
| align=center|3:09
| Atlantic City, New Jersey, United States
|
|-
| Loss
| align=center| 10–5
| Costas Philippou
| TKO (punches)
| ROC 33: Ring of Combat 33
| 
| align=center|1
| align=center|0:11
| Atlantic City, New Jersey, United States
|
|-
| Win
| align=center| 10–4
| Chris Price
| Submission (guillotine choke)
| C3: Furious
| 
| align=center|1
| align=center|1:37
| Hammond, Indiana, United States
|
|-
| Win
| align=center| 9–4
| Steve Evan Dau
| Submission (armbar)
| C3: Domination
| 
| align=center|2
| align=center|1:47
| Hammond, Indiana, United States
| 
|-
| Win
| align=center| 8–4
| Josh Mix
| Submission (armbar)
| MFL: Michiana Fight League
| 
| align=center|1
| align=center|1:03
| Plymouth, Indiana, United States
| 
|-
| Loss
| align=center| 7–4
| James Lee
| Submission (heel hook)
| KOTC: Explosion
| 
| align=center|1
| align=center|3:51
| Mount Pleasant, Michigan, United States
| 
|-
| Win
| align=center| 7–3
| Shawn McCully
| Submission (armbar)
| CFC 1: Cage Fighting Championships 1
| 
| align=center| 1
| align=center| 0:59
| United States
|
|-
| Loss
| align=center| 6–3
| Julio Paulino
| Decision (unanimous)
| CFC 1: Cage Fighting Championships 1
| 
| align=center| 3
| align=center| 5:00
| United States
| 
|-
| Win
| align=center| 6–2
| Erik Brettin
| KO
| Heartland: Ground n Pound
| 
| align=center| 1
| align=center| 0:18
| South Bend, Indiana, United States
| 
|-
| Loss
| align=center| 5–2
| Jim Martens
| Decision (unanimous)
| KOTC: Mass Destruction
| 
| align=center| 2
| align=center| 5:00
| Mount Pleasant, Michigan, United States
| 
|-
|  Win
| align=center| 5–1
| Brandon Griffin
| Submission (armbar)
| KOTC: Meltdown
| 
| align=center| 1
| align=center| 0:52
| Indianapolis, Indiana, United States
| 
|-
|  Win
| align=center| 4–1
| Jason Law
| Submission 
| UFL 2 - United Fight League 2
| 
| align=center| 1
| align=center| 
| Indianapolis, Indiana, United States
| 
|-
| Win
| align=center| 3–1
| Steve Lapear
| KO (Punches)
| Heartland - Ground n Pound
| 
| align=center| 1
| align=center| 0:40
| South Bend, Indiana, United States
| 
|-
| Win
| align=center| 2–1
| Noel Gomez
| Submission (armbar)
| UT: Ultimate Throwdown
| 
| align=center| 1
| align=center| 2:25
| Mishawaka, Indiana, United States
| 
|-
| Win
| align=center| 1–1
| Halton Flowers
| KO
| CF: Champions Factory
| 
| align=center| 1
| align=center| 0:00
| South Bend, Indiana, United States
| 
|-
| Loss
| align=center| 0–1
| Emerson Rushing
| TKO (doctor stoppage)
| TFC 3: Total Fight Challenge 3
| 
| align=center| 1
| align=center| 2:24
| Hammond, Indiana, United States
|

See also
 List of current ONE fighters

References

Notes

1985 births
Living people
Burmese male mixed martial artists
Burmese Lethwei practitioners
Burmese practitioners of Brazilian jiu-jitsu
Light heavyweight mixed martial artists
Middleweight mixed martial artists
Mixed martial artists utilizing Lethwei
Mixed martial artists utilizing Muay Thai
Mixed martial artists utilizing Brazilian jiu-jitsu
People from Myitkyina
Burmese people of Kachin descent
Andrews University alumni
Burmese expatriates in the United States
ONE Championship champions